Western spadefoot or western spadefoot toad is the common name of two different species of toads
Spea hammondii, found in North America
Pelobates cultripes, found in Europe

Animal common name disambiguation pages